The Eglisau railway bridge, or Eisenbahnbrücke Eglisau, is a single-track railway bridge which carries the Eglisau to Neuhausen line across the Rhine in Switzerland. Both ends of the bridge lie within the municipality of Eglisau and the canton of Zurich.

Technical Details 
The bridge was built between the years of 1895 and 1897 by the Swiss Northeastern Railway at a cost of 980,000 Swiss francs.

Several natural stone masonry approaches with piers up to 50m in height lead to the bridge from the north and south of the steel truss. The original carriageway, consisting of a ballasted track on Zores iron profiles, was replaced by a steel trough with ballast in 1982/1983. Several joints of the truss girder were also strengthened
using post-tensioned bolts, and the steel elements were entirely repainted for corrosion protection.

An engineering study in 2013 confirmed an additional service duration of at least 50 years for the bridge.

See also
 List of bridges over the Rhine

References

Bibliography

External links 
 
 Eglisau Railroad Bridge from Structurae

Railway bridges in Switzerland
Bridges over the Rhine
Bridges completed in 1897
19th-century architecture in Switzerland